Damir Hadžović (born August 8, 1986) is a Bosnian-born Danish mixed martial artist who competes in the Lightweight division of the Ultimate Fighting Championship (UFC).

Background
Hadžović was born to Bosnian Muslim parents in the eastern Bosnian town of Goražde in the Socialist Federal Republic of Yugoslavia (present-day Bosnia and Herzegovina).  In 1992, when he was six years old, his mother and him fled to Macedonia for a year during the Bosnian War (1992-1995). They later moved to Denmark, living in a refugee center and later were granted asylum where his dad joined them in 1996.

Unlike most MMA fighters, Hadžović was a bodybuilder prior to starting MMA. He was hooked to learn more about MMA as to find out the techniques of the sport which led him to his MMA career. Hadžović worked as a bouncer at an Irish pub in Copenhagen and as a part-time MMA referee.

Mixed martial arts career

Early career
Hadžović fought in the European circuit for six years in some of the organisations such as Cage Warriors and Venator Fighting Championships, and amassed a record 10–2, with six-fight winning streak, prior joining UFC.

Ultimate Fighting Championship
Hadžović was signed by UFC in early 2016 and he was the third Danish MMA fighter to be part of the UFC roaster after Martin Kampmann and Nicolas Dalby.

Hadžović made his promotion debut on April 10, 2016, at UFC Fight Night: Rothwell vs. dos Santos against Mairbek Taisumov.  He lost the fight via knockout in round one.

Hadžović was scheduled to face Yusuke Kasuya on September 10, 2016, at UFC 203. However the fight was postponed after Hadžović could not get the printed travel visa on time to travel to United States. The pairing was rescheduled at UFC Fight Night: Lamas vs. Penn. However, the promotion announced on October 6 that they had cancelled the event entirely.

One year after his first fight in the UFC, Hadžović returned to the cage and faced Marcin Held at UFC Fight Night: Gustafsson vs. Teixeira on May 28, 2017. Hadžović won via KO in round three when Held shot for a takedown and ran into Hadžović's knee. The win also earned Hadžović his first Performance of the Night bonus award.

Hadžović faced Alan Patrick on February 3, 2018, at UFC Fight Night 125. He lost the fight via unanimous decision.

Hadžović faced Nick Hein on July 22, 2018, at UFC Fight Night 134. He won the fight via split decision.

Hadžović faced Polo Reyes on February 23, 2019, at UFC Fight Night 145. He won the fight via knockout in the second round.

Hadžović faced Christos Giagos on June 1, 2019, at UFC Fight Night 153. He lost the fight via unanimous decision.

Hadžović faced Renato Moicano on March 14, 2020, at UFC Fight Night 170. He lost the fight via a submission in round one.

Hadžović was scheduled to face Nikolas Motta on May 8, 2021, at UFC on ESPN 24. However, Motta was pulled from the event, citing foot injury. In turn, Hadžović was rescheduled and was expected to face Yancy Medeiros two weeks later at UFC Fight Night: Font vs. Garbrandt. However, the bout was pulled from the card just hours before taking place due to health issues with Hadžović. The pairing was rescheduled on June 26, 2021, at UFC Fight Night 190. He won the fight via unanimous decision.

Hadžović was scheduled to face Steve Garcia on April 23, 2022, at UFC Fight Night 205. The fight was scrapped due to Hadžović's visa issues.

Hadžović faced Marc Diakiese on July 23, 2022, at UFC Fight Night 208. He lost the fight by unanimous decision.

Championships and accomplishments

Mixed martial arts
Ultimate Fighting Championship
Performance of the Night (One time) vs. Marcin Held

Personal life
His moniker "The Bosnian Bomber" was given to him by his MMA teammate as he did not have the proper striking technique but was "throwing bombs" when he started training MMA.

As Hadžović was born in Bosnia and raised in Denmark. He identifies himself as a Bosnian and a Dane, as he puts it: "I represent both countries, I love both countries, you know, Denmark is my home." "It's Bosnian hardware, Danish software." He is a Muslim.

Mixed martial arts record

|-
|Loss
|align=center|14–7
|Marc Diakiese
|Decision (unanimous)
|UFC Fight Night: Blaydes vs. Aspinall 
|
|align=center|3
|align=center|5:00
|London, England
|
|-
|Win
|align=center|14–6
|Yancy Medeiros
|Decision (unanimous)
|UFC Fight Night: Gane vs. Volkov
|
|align=center|3
|align=center|5:00
|Las Vegas, Nevada, United States
|
|-
|Loss
|align=center|13–6
|Renato Moicano
|Submission (rear-naked choke)
|UFC Fight Night: Lee vs. Oliveira 
|
|align=center|1
|align=center|0:44
|Brasília, Brazil
| 
|-
|Loss
|align=center|13–5
|Christos Giagos
|Decision (unanimous)
|UFC Fight Night: Gustafsson vs. Smith 
|
|align=center|3
|align=center|5:00
|Stockholm, Sweden
|
|-
|Win
|align=center|13–4
|Polo Reyes
|TKO (punches)
|UFC Fight Night: Błachowicz vs. Santos 
|
|align=center|2
|align=center|2:03
|Prague, Czech Republic
|
|-
|Win
|align=center|12–4
|Nick Hein
|Decision (split)
|UFC Fight Night: Shogun vs. Smith 
|
|align=center|3
|align=center|5:00
|Hamburg, Germany
|
|-
|Loss
|align=center|11–4
|Alan Patrick
|Decision (unanimous)
|UFC Fight Night: Machida vs. Anders 
|
|align=center|3
|align=center|5:00
|Belém, Brazil
|
|-
| Win
| align=center| 11–3
| Marcin Held
| KO (knee)
| UFC Fight Night: Gustafsson vs. Teixeira
| 
| align=center| 3
| align=center| 0:07
| Stockholm, Sweden
|
|-
| Loss
| align=center| 10–3
| Mairbek Taisumov
| KO (punch)
| UFC Fight Night: Rothwell vs. dos Santos
| 
| align=center| 1
| align=center| 3:44
| Zagreb, Croatia
|
|-
| Win
| align=center| 10–2
| Ivan Musardo
| TKO (corner stoppage)
| Venator FC: Guerrieri Italiani Finals
| 
| align=center| 2
| align=center| 5:00
| Bologna, Italy
|
|-
| Win
| align=center| 9–2
| Martin Delaney
| Decision (unanimous)
| Cage Warriors 69
| 
| align=center| 3
| align=center| 5:00
| London, England
|
|-
| Win
| align=center| 8–2
| John Maguire
| KO (knees and punches)
| Cage Warriors 66
| 
| align=center| 1
| align=center| 3:58
| Ballerup, Denmark
|
|-
| Win
| align=center| 7–2
| Thibault Colleuil
| Submission (armbar)
| European MMA 7
| 
| align=center| 1
| align=center| N/A
| Aarhus, Denmark
|
|-
| Win
| align=center| 6–2
| Nic Osei
| TKO (punches)
| WKN Valhalla: Battle of the Vikings
| 
| align=center| 2
| align=center| 0:00
| Aarhus, Denmark
|
|-
| Win
| align=center| 5–2
| Matej Truhan
| Decision (majority)
| Royal Arena 2
| 
| align=center| 3
| align=center| 5:00
| Copenhagen, Denmark
|
|-
| Loss
| align=center| 4–2
| Krzysztof Jotko
| Decision (unanimous)
| MMA Attack 2
| 
| align=center| 3
| align=center| 5:00
| Katowice, Poland
|
|-
| Loss
| align=center| 4–1
| Andreas Ståhl
| Decision (unanimous)
| Cage Fight Live 2
| 
| align=center| 3
| align=center| 5:00
| Herning, Denmark
|
|-
| Win
| align=center| 4–0
| Jaroslav Poborský
| Submission (rear-naked choke)
| Cage Fight Live 1
| 
| align=center| 2
| align=center| 3:14
| Herning, Denmark
|
|-
| Win
| align=center| 3–0
| Michael Hojermark
| TKO (doctor stoppage)
| The Zone FC 7
| 
| align=center| 3
| align=center| 3:11
| Gothenburg, Sweden
|
|-
| Win
| align=center| 2–0
| Tim Waage
| Submission (D'Arce choke)
| Fighter Gala 15
| 
| align=center| 1
| align=center| 4:18
| Odense, Denmark
|
|-
| Win
| align=center| 1–0
| Alaan Briefkani
| TKO (leg kicks and elbows)
| Fighter Gala 11
| 
| align=center| 1
| align=center| 3:29
| Odense, Denmark
|
|-

See also
 List of current UFC fighters
 List of male mixed martial artists

References

External links
 
 

Living people
1986 births
Bosnia and Herzegovina emigrants to Denmark
Danish male mixed martial artists
Bosnia and Herzegovina male mixed martial artists
Danish people of Bosnia and Herzegovina descent
Danish practitioners of Brazilian jiu-jitsu
Bosnia and Herzegovina practitioners of Brazilian jiu-jitsu
Lightweight mixed martial artists
Mixed martial artists utilizing wrestling
Mixed martial artists utilizing boxing
Mixed martial artists utilizing Brazilian jiu-jitsu
Yugoslav Wars refugees
Ultimate Fighting Championship male fighters